Local elections was held in Antipolo on May 10, 2010, within the Philippine general election. The voters elected candidates for the elective local posts in the city: the mayor, vice mayor, the two district congressmen, two provincial board members of Rizal, one for each district, and the sixteen councilors, eight in each of the city's districts.

Background 
Acting Mayor and former Vice Mayor Danilo Leyble sought for his first full term. He was challenged by former Mayor and incumbent Second District Representative Angelito "Lito" Gatlabayan, Silverio "Ver" Bulanon, Wilfredo "Willie" Garcia, and Edgardo "Ka Ed" Purawan.

Acting Vice Mayor and former Second District Councilor Lorenzo Zapanta won't ran for re-election He ran as representative of Second District. Susan Garcia-Say ran for his place instead. Garcia was challenged by former First District Councilor Serafin "Apin"  Alvaran, Basilio Mendoza, Maria Teresa "Tess" Trinidad, and Glicerio "Toto" Vallega.

Incumbent First District Representative Roberto "Robbie" Puno sought for his second term. He was challenged by Ricardo "Carding" Dapat, Florante "Ante" Quizon, Primer "Prime" Pagunuran, and Salvador "Raldy" Abaño.

Incumbent Second District Angelito "Lito" Gatlabayan ran for Mayor. Former Vice Mayor Lorenzo Zapanta ran for his place. Zapanta was challenged by former Councilor and former Rizal Vice Governor Anthony Jesus "Jestoni" Alarcon, Lorenzo Juan "LJ" Sumulong III,  Romeo "Romy" Acop, Marcelino "Boyet" Arellano, Hoover "Ver" Simbillo, Virginia "Gie" Mendoza, and Federico "Dick" Marquez, brother of incumbent First District Councilor and re-electionist Alexander "Bobot" Marquez.

Incumbent First District Board Member Arnel Camacho won't ran for re-election. Agripino "Atan" Garcia ran for his place. Garcia was challenged by First District Councilor Ronald Barcena, Jacinto "Ento" Canales, Dr. Enrico "Doc Rico" De Guzman, and Federico 'Erik" Zapanta.

Incumbent Second District Board Member Zacarias Tapales won't ran for re-election, he ran as councilor for Second District instead. Incumbent Second District Councilor Jesus Angelito "Joel" Huertas Jr. ran for his place. Huertas was challenged by Nelia "Nel" Bulanon and German "Gerry" Mata.

Results

For Mayor 
Acting Mayor Danilo Leyble defeated incumbent Second District Representative Angelito Gatlabayan for mayoral race.

For Vice Mayor 
Susana Garcia-Say defeated former First District Councilor Serafin "Apin" Alvaran.

For Representative

First District 
Roberto Puno was re-elected. Puno defeated Ricardo "Carding" Dapat of Nationalist People's Coalition.

Second District 
Romeo Acop defeated other prominent candidates, including Lorenzo Juan "LJ" Sumulong III, former Vice Governor Anthony Jesus "Jestoni" Alarcon, Federico Marquez, and Acting Vice Mayor Lorenzo Zapanta.

For City Councilors

Candidates

First District

Second District

References

2010 Philippine local elections
Politics of Antipolo
Elections in Antipolo
2010 elections in Calabarzon